Oliver Cooper (born 1989), is an American actor.

Oliver Cooper may also refer to:
Oliver Cooper (politician) (born 1987), English politician
Oli Cooper (born 1999), Welsh footballer

See also
Olive Cooper (1892–1987), American screenwriter